Exosome component 10, also known as EXOSC10, is a human gene, the protein product of which is part of the exosome complex and is an autoantigen is patients with certain auto immune diseases, most notably scleromyositis.

References

Further reading